Ronald Nickolas Rowe (November 30, 1925 – July 28, 2005) was Canadian professional ice hockey player who played five games in the National Hockey League with the New York Rangers during the 1947–48 season. The rest of his career, which lasted from 1943 to 1957, was spent in various minor and senior leagues.

Career
Rowe played soccer in Toronto and then enjoyed a career as a professional ice hockey player.

Rowe was initially offered a contract by the Toronto Maple Leafs during the 1942-43 season for $2,900 a year and $75 a week while in the minors.

Rowe was recalled by the Rangers during the 1947–48 season. Rowe's NHL career lasted five games, where he scored one assist.

Death
Rowe died on July 28, 2005. He was 79 years old.

Career statistics

Regular season and playoffs

External links
 

1925 births
2005 deaths
Boston Olympics players
Canadian expatriate ice hockey players in the United States
Canadian ice hockey left wingers
New York Rangers players
New York Rovers players
St. Paul Saints (USHL) players
Ice hockey people from Toronto
Tacoma Rockets (WHL) players
Toronto Marlboros players
Vancouver Canucks (WHL) players